Greenport Union Free School District is a public school district located on the North Fork of Long Island, in the Town of Southold, Suffolk County, New York, United States.  It includes the village of Greenport, as well as the census-designated place (CDP) of Greenport West.  To the west, the district is bordered by the Southold Union Free School District; and on the east, the Oysterponds Union Free School District.

The total enrollment for the 2017–2018 school year was 638 students.

Schools

 Greenport High School.  The current high school building was originally opened in 1933.   The school also educates students from Oysterponds Union Free School District.
 Greenport Elementary School 
 The current elementary school building was built in 1933

References

External links
 Greenport Union Free School District Website

Southold, New York
School districts in New York (state)
Education in Suffolk County, New York